Cirebon Train Station (Station Code: CN) also known as Cirebon Kejaksan Station is the main railway station in the Cirebon area located on Siliwangi Street, Kebonbaru, Kejaksan, Cirebon. The station is located at DAOP 3 area as North Cross Line, but in this station there is also cross line in Purwokerto Station which is connected by South Cross Line in Kroya Station.

As a transfer station, Cirebon Station is one-side station where the emplacement is located one side linearly with station building.

History

The current building of Cirebon Station was the work of a Dutch architect Pieter Adriaan Jacobus Moojen. It was built by the train company Staats Spoorwegen (SS) in 1912. The architecture of the building follows the Dutch Rationalist conformed into the tropics, becoming a new vernacular style sometimes dubbed the New Indies Style.

In 2011, Cirebon and  stations were renovated by elevating the platforms, increasing the number of lanes and the existing facilities.

Services
The following is a list of train services at the Cirebon Station

Passenger services
 Executive class
 Executive and business class
 Ranggajati from and to  via  - 
 Executive and economy class
 Argo Cheribon from and to 

References

External links
 

Buildings and structures in Cirebon
Cultural Properties of Indonesia in West Java
Railway stations in West Java
Railway stations opened in 1912
1912 establishments in the Dutch East Indies